The Kerala Legislative Assembly, popularly known as the Niyamasabha, is the State Assembly of Kerala. In 1956, the State of Kerala was formed on linguistic basis, merging Travancore, Cochin, and Malabar regions, and the Kasaragod Taluk of South Canara. Delimitation of the assembly constituencies happened many times. Initially there were 114 assembly constituencies. In 1965 it increased to 133. Again it was increased to 140 in 1977. Currently Kerala has 140 assembly constituencies and 20 Loksabha constituencies.

During these delimitation processes some of the constituencies become defunct and some are newly added.

Party names

Kerala Niyamasabha

1957-1960

1965-1970

1957-1970

1977-2006

1965-2006

1957-2006

References

 
Kerala